Pimelea microcephala, commonly known as mallee rice-flower or shrubby rice-flower is a species of flowering plant in the family Thymelaeaceae and is endemic to mainland Australia. It is an erect shrub with compact heads of male or female, white to yellow or greenish flowers on separate plants, the heads surrounded by 2 or 4 leaf-like involucral bracts.

Description
The flowers are glabrous inside and usually densely curly-hairy on the outside, on a hairy pedicel. Flowering mainly occurs from April to September and the fruit is a succulent, red nut.

Taxonomy
Pimelea microcephala was first formally described by Robert Brown in Prodromus Florae Novae Hollandiae in 1810.

In 1983 S. Threlfall described two subspecies of P. microcephala in the journal Brunonia, and the names are accepted by the Australian Plant Census:

Distribution and habitat
Mallee rice-flower grows in shrubland, woodland and mallee, and is widespread in all mainland states of Australia and in the Northern Territory. It is found in the north-west of Victoria, in inland New South Wales, in the south of the Northern Territory and in the Avon Wheatbelt, Carnarvon, Coolgardie, Gascoyne, Geraldton Sandplains, Great Victoria Desert, Mallee, Murchison Nullarbor, Pilbara and Yalgoo bioregions of Western Australia.

Subspecies glabra is restricted to the north-west of South Australia.

References

microcephala
Flora of New South Wales
Flora of the Northern Territory
Flora of Queensland
Flora of South Australia
Flora of Victoria (Australia)
Rosids of Western Australia
Malvales of Australia
Dioecious plants
Plants described in 1810
Taxa named by Robert Brown (botanist, born 1773)